The 2023 Redcar and Cleveland Borough Council election will take place on 4 May 2023 to elect members of Redcar and Cleveland Borough Council in England. This will be on the same day as other local elections.

All 59 seats in all wards are up for election. Redcar and Cleveland Borough Council's elections occur every four years.

Elections 
On the same day as the Redcar and Cleveland Borough Council Election, there will also be elections for Parish Councils, such as Guisborough Parish Council.

Pre-election council composition 
The current Redcar and Cleveland Administration is a coalition of the Liberal Democrats and The Independent Group. The groups have shared responsibilities and there is a mixed party executive.

Members of the council are of multiple parties and independents.

References 

 
Local elections
Council elections in the United Kingdom
May 2023 events in the United Kingdom
2023
2020s in North Yorkshire